Nigeria Super Cup (also known as Charity Cup or Charity Shield) is a game that features the FA Cup and Nigerian Premier League winners. It usually commence before the start of a new season.

Winners
1999:Lobi Stars
2000: Julius Berger F.C.
2001: Enyimba F.C.
2002: Julius Berger F.C.
2003: Enyimba F.C.
2004: Enugu Rangers
2005: 
2006: Ocean Boys F.C.
2007: 
2008: Kano Pillars 
2009: Bayelsa United
2010:
2011:
2012:
2013:
2014:
2015: Akwa United
2016: Ifeanyi Ubah F.C.
 2017: did not hold
2018: Lobi Stars F.C.

References

National association football supercups
Football competitions in Nigeria
Recurring sporting events established in 1999
1999 establishments in Nigeria